Sweet Buns & Barbeque is the eleventh album led by saxophonist Houston Person which was recorded in 1972 and released on the Prestige label.

Reception

Allmusic awarded the album 3 stars.

Track listing 
 "A Song for You" (Leon Russell) - 4:35   
 "The Trouble with Hello is Goodbye (Love Theme from “Fuzz”)" (Dave Grusin, Alan Bergman, Marilyn Bergman) - 4:00   
 "Scared to Be Alone" (Dory Previn) - 4:20   
 "Sweet Buns and Barbeque" (Houston Person, Billy Ver Planc) - 3:05   
 "This Masquerade" (Russell) - 6:20   
 "Down Here on the Ground" (Gale Garnett, Lalo Schifrin) - 3:45   
 "Put It Where You Want It" (Joe Sample) - 3:10   
 "Groove Thang" (Johnny Bristol) - 3:00

Personnel 
Houston Person - tenor saxophone
Ernie Royal, Victor Paz - trumpet (tracks 6-8)
Frank Wess - flute, baritone saxophone (tracks 6-8)  
Richard Tee - piano, electric piano (tracks 1-3)
Jimmy Watson - organ (track 5) 
Hugh McCracken - guitar (tracks 1 & 3) 
Joe Beck - guitar, electric guitar, arranger 
Ron Carter (tracks 1-3), George Duvivier (tracks 4-8) - bass
Grady Tate - drums (tracks 1-3)
Bernard Purdie - drums (tracks 4-8)
Buddy Caldwell - congas, percussion (tracks 4, 5, 7 & 8)
 Billy Ver Planck - arranger (tracks 6-8)

References 

Houston Person albums
1973 albums
Prestige Records albums
Albums recorded at Van Gelder Studio
Albums produced by Ozzie Cadena